Haywood Eugene "Butch" Norman (born August 23, 1952) is an American-born Canadian football player who played professionally for the Winnipeg Blue Bombers.

References

1952 births
Living people
Winnipeg Blue Bombers players
People from Luverne, Alabama
Alabama Crimson Tide football players